KTJZ (97.5 FM) is a radio station licensed to serve the community of Tallulah, Louisiana. The station is owned by Mid South Communications Company, Inc., and airs an urban contemporary format.

The station was assigned the KTJZ call letters by the Federal Communications Commission on March 10, 2005.

References

External links
 Official Website
 FCC Public Inspection File for KTJZ
 

Radio stations in Louisiana
Radio stations established in 2007
2007 establishments in Louisiana
Urban contemporary radio stations in the United States
Madison Parish, Louisiana